Coppice is a locality and urban/suburban area the town of Oldham, in Greater Manchester, England.

It is located to the south of Oldham town centre and is contiguous with other areas of Oldham including Hathershaw, Werneth, Hollins, Copster Hill and Primrose Bank.

Coppice is the location of Hulme Grammar School and Werneth Cricket Club whose ground is known as 'The Coppice'.

References

Areas of Oldham